Paolo Foti (born 12 August 1949 in Agira) is an Italian politician.

He is a member of the Democratic Party and was elected Mayor of Avellino on 8 June 2013 and took office on 11 June. He served as mayor until 12 July 2018.

See also
2013 Italian local elections
List of mayors of Avellino

References

External links
 

1949 births
Living people
Mayors of Avellino
Democratic Party (Italy) politicians